Vinod Raj is an Indian actor known for his work in Kannada cinema. He worked with actors such as Ambareesh, Arjun Sarja, Ramesh Arvind, Srinivas Murthy.

In 2009, he released his album named Bhaktanjali, which consists of devotional songs. Vinod Raj has performed vocals for some of the movies he has worked in. He once asserted that Michael Jackson was his inspiration for both singing and dancing.

Career 
His dance moves in Dance Raja Dance, a Kannada dance movie, gained popularity on YouTube and were used in Grand Theft Auto: Liberty City Stories. After working in other fields, Vinod Raj continued working in the Kannada film industry.

Filmography

Film 

Dance Raja Dance (1987)
Sri Venkateshwara Mahime (1988)
Krishna Nee Kunidaga (1989)
College Hero (1990)
Nanagu Hendthi Beku (1991)
Yuddha Parva (1991)
Nayaka (1991)
Banni Ondsala Nodi (1992)
Gili Bete(1992)
Nanjunda (1993)
Captain (1993)
Bombat Raja Bandal Rani (1995)
Rambha Rajyadalli Rowdy (1995)
Mahabharatha (1997)
Raajanna (1999)
Dalavayi (1999)
Snehaloka (1999)
Om Shakthi (1999)
Brahma Vishnu (2001)
Vande Mataram (2001)
Rashtrageethe (2001)
Sri Manjunatha (2001)
Namma Samsara Ananda Sagara (2001)
Pandava (2004)
Kannadada Kanda (2006)
Shukra (2007)
Yaaradu (2009)

Television 
 Rock n Roll (judge)

References 

Male actors in Kannada cinema
Indian male film actors
Kannada male actors
Tulu people
Male actors from Chennai
Living people
20th-century Indian male actors
21st-century Indian male actors
Indian male dancers
Dancers from Tamil Nadu
1967 births